Aviation Without Borders (AWB) is a British charity that provides assistance through aviation services, primarily between the UK and Africa.

AWB was first registered in the UK as a charity in 2006 and has a small office at the London Heathrow Airport.

The charity's activities include air transport links with light aircraft in support of other NGOs in developing countries and air cargo shipment of humanitarian supplies.

References

External links 
 

Aviation organisations based in the United Kingdom
Non-profit organisations based in London
Organizations established in 1980
1980 establishments in England